Sutton upon Tern is a civil parish in Shropshire, England.  It contains 24 listed buildings that are recorded in the National Heritage List for England.  Of these, four are  listed at Grade II*, the middle of the three grades, and the others are at Grade II, the lowest grade.  The parish contains the village of Sutton upon Tern and is otherwise largely rural.  The Shropshire Union Canal passes through the parish, and the listed buildings associated with it are two bridges and a milepost.  In the parish are the country houses Buntingsdale Hall and Pell Wall, and another large house, Colehurst Manor, which are listed together with associated structures.  The other listed buildings are farmhouses, farm buildings, a road bridge, a milestone, and a coach house and stables.


Key

Buildings

References

Citations

Sources

Lists of buildings and structures in Shropshire